The diamond tetra (Moenkhausia pittieri) is a small freshwater fish of the characin family (family Characidae) of order Characiformes. It is found in and around Lake Valencia in Venezuela, South America.

Description
This species exhibits clear sexual dimorphism, with males having much longer dorsal fins than the females. Males also tend to be more brightly coloured, but both sexes are attractive fish and have become popular with aquarists. The dorsal and anal fins are purple and the body is silver. The eye is marked with red above the pupil, and there is a dark band running along the midline of the body. Their common name comes from the bright, iridescent scales along the flanks. This species very much resemble Metynnis and Myleus species.

Although the patronym was not identified, it is probably in honor of Swiss-born geographer-botanist Henri François Pittier (1857–1950), who lived in Venezuela and collected some specimens for Eigenmann.

Habitat
Diamond tetras are endemic to the northern area of Venezuela. They hail originally from the waters of Lake Valencia, located between the states Carabobo and Aragua, and its tributaries. They inhabit slow moving streams with abundant vegetation and leaf litter. These fish are threatened by urban growth, which destroys and pollutes their habitat. The species has seemingly disappeared completely from Lake Valencia, where they were collected initially. In 2009 the Venezuelan underwater photographer Ivan Mikolji was able to find and photograph a population of this fish in a stream nearby Lake Valencia.

In the aquarium

Nutrition
The diamond tetra is an omnivore. In the wild they eat whatever they can forage, with a preference for small animal food items, especially mosquito larvae.
In a home aquarium they eat most standard fish foods, such as flakes and pellets. They benefit from a variety of food such as live daphnia or frozen bloodworms.

Breeding
A pair or group of diamond tetras will spawn in an aquarium with a shaded area, which can be created by including fine-leaved plants such as Java moss or a spawning mop. The fish should be well conditioned beforehand with nutritious food, preferably small live foods.

Soft acidic water in the pH range of 5.5–6.5 is preferred, and a temperature of around 26–29°C (80–84°F) is suitable.

The fish usually spawn in the early morning. If not removed from the tank, the adults will eat their eggs. It is recommended to remove them after spawning. The eggs normally hatch within 36 hours and the fry are usually free swimming in around 4 days.

Diamond tetra fry grow quickly. They can feed on pre-made fry foods, but suitably sized live foods will help at all stages of development.

References

http://aquatic-experts.com/ARTICLE_First_Ever_Photos_of_Diamond_Tetras_in_their_natural_habitat.html
http://aquatic-experts.com/Moenkhausia_pittieri.html

Riehl R. & Baensch H: Aquarium Atlas (vol. 1), Voyageur Press, 1996, 
https://web.archive.org/web/20110120185420/http://www.bettatrading.com.au/Diamond-Tetra-Fact-Sheet.php
https://mikolji.com/article/diamond-tetras-moenkhausia-pittieri-wild

Tetras
Taxa named by Carl H. Eigenmann
Fish described in 1920